Paul Raymond Haywood (born 30 March 1947, in Leicester) is an English former cricketer active from 1969 to 1977 who played for Leicestershire. He appeared in 54 first-class matches as a righthanded batsman who bowled right arm medium pace. He scored 1,570 runs with a highest score of 100 * and took nine wickets with a best performance of four for 60.

Notes

1947 births
English cricketers
Leicestershire cricketers
Living people